Ridvan Yilmaz (born 21 May 2001) is a Turkish professional footballer who plays as a left back for Scottish Premiership club Rangers and the Turkish national team.

Club career

Beşiktaş
Yilmaz spent all 10 years of his youth career in the academy of Beşiktaş. Yılmaz made his professional debut with Beşiktaş as a late sub in a 2–7 Süper Lig win over Çaykur Rizespor on 8 April 2019 .

Rangers
On 25 July 2022, Yilmaz joined Scottish club Rangers on a five-year deal for an undisclosed fee. He made his debut for the club as a substitute against Belgian side Union Saint-Gilloise during a UEFA Champions League qualifier loss on 2 August.

International career
Yilmaz was called up to the Turkish national football team preliminary squad for Euro 2020. He made his debut on 27 May 2021 in a friendly against Azerbaijan.

Career statistics

Club

International

Honours

Club
Beşiktaş J.K.
Süper Lig: 2020–21
Türkiye Kupası: 2020–21
Süper Kupa: 2021

References

External links
 
 
 

2001 births
Living people
People from Gaziosmanpaşa
Turkish footballers
Turkey youth international footballers
Turkey under-21 international footballers
Turkey international footballers
Beşiktaş J.K. footballers
Rangers F.C. players
Süper Lig players
Scottish Professional Football League players
Association football fullbacks
UEFA Euro 2020 players
Turkish expatriate sportspeople in Scotland
Turkish expatriate footballers
Expatriate footballers in Scotland